The European Bureau for Conservation and Development (EBCD) is an environmentally focused non governmental organisation (NGO) founded in 1989 and based in Brussels, Belgium. EBCD aims to promote sustainable use of natural renewable resources not just in Europe, but worldwide as well. The EBCD works closely with the European Union (EU) institutions, tracking EU work on environmental policy, concentrating on fisheries and marine policies.

EBCD provides, in association with the International Union for Conservation of Nature, the Secretariat of the European Parliament Intergroup: “Climate Change, Biodiversity and Sustainable Development”.

EBCD's mission: to ensure the conservation and sustainable use of natural renewable resources including species and ecosystems both for their intrinsic and direct value to the benefit of humanity

Main Activities 
 Secretariat of the European Parliament Intergroup on “Climate Change, Biodiversity and Sustainable Development”
 Secretariat of the IUCN European Sustainable Use Specialist Group (ESUSG) and the coordination of Fisheries Working Group (FWG)
 Secretariat of the Fisheries Experts Group of the IUCN/CEM/FEG

References 

Environmental organisations based in Belgium
Nature conservation organisations based in Europe
European Union and the environment